Scott Clem (born April 6, 1984) is an American politician who served as a Republican member of the Wyoming House of Representatives from the 31st district from 2015 to 2021.

Elections

2014
After incumbent Republican Representative and Speaker of the House Tom Lubnau announced his retirement, Clem announced his candidacy.  He defeated Brenda Schladweiler in the Republican primary and then defeated Democratic candidate Billy Montgomery in the general election, 79% to 21%.

2016
Clem ran unopposed in the Republican primary, and defeated Democrat Dylan Czarnecki in the general election with 89% of the vote.

Personal life
Clem is the former pastor at Central Baptist Church in Gillette. Clem has been paralyzed from the waist down since the age 19 due to injuries sustained

References

External links
Official page at the Wyoming Legislature
Profile from Ballotpedia

1984 births
Living people
Republican Party members of the Wyoming House of Representatives
People from Gillette, Wyoming
Sheridan College alumni
21st-century American politicians
Baptist ministers from the United States
American politicians with disabilities